ACOG may refer to:

Advanced Combat Optical Gunsight
American College of Obstetricians and Gynecologists
Atlanta Committee for the Olympic Games